Tom Nickalls (1828–1899) was a stockjobber on the stock exchange and one of the founding members of London Rowing Club. He was known as the "king of the American railroad market"  after making his fortune in American railway shares.

Biography
Nickalls was born on 8 September 1828, the son of Patteson Nickalls (1798–1869) and Arabella née Chalk (1799–1893) and brother of Patteson Nickalls and he married Emily Quihampton. As a boy he was sent to America to work for an uncle who had a livery stables in Chicago, where he gained first-hand knowledge of the surrounding terrain and an understanding of which routes would be of strategic importance for developing railways – information which proved invaluable when he returned to England work as a jobber on the London Stock Exchange. Another soubriquet was "The Erie King", following his successful speculation in shares of the Erie Railroad during the Erie War.

A keen sportsman and for many years a Master of the Surrey Stag Hounds, Tom Nickalls had a hunting lodge in Norway. In 1893, he sent four pairs of Norwegian skis  as a present to his daughter Florence and son in law William Adolf Baillie Grohman who lived in the Austrian Tyrol – one of the earliest recorded uses of skis in Austria.

Tom Nickalls died on 10 May 1899 in Surrey, United Kingdom.

References

1827 births
1899 deaths
Tom